Nitrate reductase (cytochrome) (respiratory nitrate reductase, benzyl viologen-nitrate reductase) is an enzyme with systematic name ferrocytochrome:nitrate oxidoreductase. This enzyme catalises the following chemical reaction

 2 ferrocytochrome + 2 H+ + nitrate  2 ferricytochrome + nitrite

References

External links 
 

EC 1.9.6